Furman Leon "Fitz" Nuss (February 2, 1895 – February 5, 1986) was an American football and basketball coach.  He served as the head football coach at Alderson–Broaddus College—now known as Alderson Broaddus University—in Philippi, West Virginia for one season, in 1924, compiling a record of 3–4–2.

Nuss graduated from Washington & Jefferson College in 1917.

Later life
In his later life, Nuss operated a tire shop and worked in the gas drilling industry. He died on February 5, 1986, at the Hubert Lane Health Care Center in Washington, Pennsylvania, after a long illness.

References

External links
 

1895 births
1986 deaths
Alderson Broaddus Battlers football coaches
Basketball coaches from Pennsylvania
Bethany Bison football coaches
Bethany Bison men's basketball coaches
Washington & Jefferson Presidents football coaches
Washington & Jefferson Presidents football players
Washington & Jefferson Presidents men's basketball coaches
People from Greene County, Pennsylvania